Hans Peter Holm (17 June 1772 – 26 October 1812) was a Danish naval officer who commanded vessels of the Dano-Norwegian Navy in several actions. He commanded several naval vessels during the Gunboat War. His most important action occurred in 1812 at the Battle of Lyngør when a British squadron, led by the British ship-of-the-line , destroyed his vessel, . Holm sustained wounds in the battle but survived, only to drown in an accident shortly afterwards.

Biography
Holm was born 17 June 1772 at Søholm, north of Copenhagen, to ship's master Peter Holm (1725–1786) and Christence Morslet (1744–1819). In 1807 he married Marie Heegaard (1791–1860), daughter of a plantation owner in St Croix in the Danish West Indies (DWI; now the US Virgin Islands). He died 26 October 1812 at Langesundsfjorden, Bamble, Telemark (SW of Oslo), and is buried in Langesund Church.

Early career 
At the age of 12, Holm accompanied his father, who was a ship's master in the Danish East India Company, on a strenuous voyage to the East. Upon his return to Denmark in 1785 he enrolled as a cadet at the Naval Cadet Academy in Copenhagen, from which he graduated on  6 March 1789.

As a junior lieutenant, he saw service in the Norske Løve, and in Havfruen with the home squadron. In 1793–94 he was serving on board the brig  on its cruise to the Danish West Indies. After further spells in home waters on board HDMS Fredericksværn (then acting as a cadet training ship), and HDMS Cronborg, he was aboard  in the Mediterranean under the leadership of Steen Andersen Bille during the Danish attack on Tripoli.

Holm received promotion to senior lieutenant on 3 November 1798. He then served as the recruiting officer at Arendal, southern Norway. Spells at sea followed, including serving on board HDMS Oldenburg on 15 November 1798 when a severe storm in Table Bay, South Africa, drove the vessel ashore. Holm served again in the Mediterranean in 1800–01 on the ship Sejeren.

Danish West Indies 
Lougen returned to Copenhagen on 7 September 1802.

Almost immediately, Holm returned to the DWI for a period of some ten months, but was back in Denmark in June 1804. His next assignment was as a recruiting officer in Tønning, tasked with stopping foreign vessels hiring Danish seamen.

Soon, however, he was back in the DWI as chief pilot and harbour master on St Croix, which positions he retained during the British occupation of the island from December 1807, until the spring of 1809. During his time in the DWI, Holm was promoted to Commander (Kapt Lt) on 1 March 1805.

He returned to Europe on an American brig in 1809. Holm then became second-in-command of the ship-of-the-line Pultusk, blockaded in the River Scheldt, until December 1810.

Norwegian service 

After his promotion to full captain on 17 March 1811, Holm took command of the brig  and was the senior officer of the squadron of similar warships stationed in Norway. In this position he planned and executed patrols along the western coast, which brought him recognition from King Frederick VI.

On 1 May 1811 armed boats from Holm's squadron blunted and repelled a raid launched from three British ships on Egersund.

On 3 August 1811 he was engaged in a long but inconclusive fight with the formerly Danish brig . (The British had seized Brev Drageren at the battle of Copenhagen in 1807.)

For his success, Holm was appointed captain of the newly built frigate  in 1812, but difficulties encountered on her maiden voyage and in training up the new crew and coordinating her movements with the brigs meant that she was not fully combat ready until 1 June 1812.

On 2 July 1812 Holm took Najaden to sea from Stavern where some repairs had been made, to sail to Kristiansand, but contrary winds forced him to seek shelter in Sandoya. With a British ship-of-the-line hunting for him, he took Najaden into Lyngør harbour which was considered totally safe from larger warships, but this reckoning proved false and the Battle of Lyngør ensued. The battle ended in a decisive victory of the British forces and Najaden was sunk.

Death 

Following the catastrophic loss of Najaden, Holm assumed command of a squadron of gunboats based in Sandøyasund. Orders to take over the command of a French ship-of-the-line, L'Albanais, were sent to him but never received as, on 26 October 1812, he was overcome in a storm in Langesundsfjord and drowned. A single iron column now stands to his memory in Langesund Churchyard, where he was buried with full military honours.

Four generations 
Peter Holm Asiatic Company (Danish East India Company)
Hans Peter Holm (17 June 1772 to 26 October 1812). Son of Peter Holm and Christence Morslet (1744–1819). Married plantation owner's daughter Marie Heegaard (1791–1860).
Peter Christian Holm (25 December 1807 to 2 October 1864). Son of Hans Peter Holm. Commanded the frigate Jylland at the battle of Helgoland 9 May 1864. Buried and memorial at Holmens Kirke.
Hans Peter Holm (19 July 1847 to 28 January 1929). Son of Peter Christian Holm. Danish naval officer. Accomplished naval artist.
Gustav Frederick Holm (6 August 1849 to approx 1929). Son of Peter Christian Holm. Danish naval officer.

Notes 
Footnotes

References

Bibliography 

Store Norske Leksikon, citing Norsk biografisk leksikon

1772 births
1812 deaths
18th-century Danish naval officers
19th-century Danish naval officers
Royal Danish Naval Academy alumni
Danish military personnel of the Napoleonic Wars
Deaths due to shipwreck